= Radio Free Montenegro =

Radio Free Montenegro was a radio station in Montenegro.
